John Anster Christian Fitzgerald (1819 – 1906) was a Victorian era fairy painter and portrait artist. He was nicknamed "Fairy Fitzgerald" for his main genre. Many of his fairy paintings are dark and contain images of ghouls, demons, and references to drug use; his work has been compared to the surreal nightmare-scapes of Hieronymus Bosch and Pieter Brueghel.

Life and career

The year of his birth in Lambeth in south London has been variously given. He was of Irish ancestry, the son of the minor poet William Thomas Fitzgerald.

In 1849 Fitzgerald married Mary Ann Barr and they raised at least four sons and two daughters.

As an artist, Fitzgerald appears to have been largely self-taught. His work was first shown at the Royal Academy of Arts, London, in 1845; he also exhibited at the British Institution, the Society of British Artists, and the Royal Watercolour Society. In the late 1850s he created a series of Christmas fairies for the Illustrated London News.

Fitzgerald gave his works titles that often gave little clear indication of their subjects; art dealers and collectors frequently renamed them, causing great confusion in his artistic canon. Some of Fitzgerald's titles, like The Pipe Dream and The Captive Dreamer, suggest that "Fitzgerald was familiar with the opium dens which, with chloral and laudanum, represented the Victorian drug scene."

Fitzgerald created "remarkable fairy pictures of pure fantasy, rarely based on any literary theme." His paintings often use brilliant colours, especially reds, blues, and purples, as in The Captive Robin shown here. He produced a major series of paintings on the Cock Robin theme—among others, Who Killed Cock Robin?, Cock Robin Defending his Nest, and Fairies Sleeping in a Bird's Nest (the last furnished with a frame made out of twigs).

Reclusive by nature, Fitzgerald had limited connections with other artists. He existed mainly at his London club, the Savage Club. Fellow members, reminiscing of him post mortem, recalled that he was adept at imitating the great actors of earlier generations, Edmund Kean, Charles Kemble, and William Charles Macready.

The final work Fitzgerald exhibited at the Royal Academy, in 1902, was a picture of Alice in Wonderland. Twentieth-century art forgers have been active in creating phony Fitzgerald fairy pictures. The forgeries were discovered when analysis revealed modern pigments. Brought to public attention by the 1998 exhibition of Victorian fairy paintings at the Royal Academy of Arts his paintings have since sold for up to £500,000, although most sell at prices between £30,000 and £120,000.

His younger daughter, Florence Harriet Fitzgerald (1857–1927), was a painter and sculptor. She married landscape artist Walter Follen Bishop (1856–1936) in 1889.

Gallery

Notes

References

External links
 
 
 
 
 Illusions gallery: 16 images
 Fairy Lovers in a Bird's Nest Watching a White Mouse
 The Concert
 

19th-century English painters
English male painters
20th-century English painters
Fantasy artists
British speculative fiction artists
1906 deaths
Year of birth uncertain
1819 births
20th-century English male artists
19th-century English male artists